Jefnier Osorio Moreno (born October 4, 2000), known professionally as Lunay, is a Puerto Rican singer and rapper. He rose to fame in the Latin and reggaeton scene with the songs "A Solas", "Luz Apaga", "Soltera", and "Soltera (Remix)".  On October 25, 2019, he released his debut album Épico.

Early life 
As a child, his true passion was the drums and soccer. Thanks to the sport of soccer Osorio found his vocation in music. At an early age he knew he wanted to be part of the urban genre, motivated by what other singers of the genre in Latin America were achieving. At age 12, he began recording freestyle raps, which he uploaded to Facebook. He used to improvise in front of his soccer teammates, with several of his clips going viral. His freestyle raps caught the attention of producers like Chris Jeday and Gaby Music.

Career 
In 2017, he started uploading small musical projects to SoundCloud under the name of "Jefnier", entering more seriously in the music industry. In 2017, he launched "Aparentas", reaching thousands of reproductions on this platform, attracting the attention of two of the most recognized producers in Puerto Rico: Chris Jeday and Gaby Music. Both producers contacted the young Puerto Rican offering him a record deal and after signing, in May 2018, he changed his stage name to Lunay.

That same month he released the song "Si Te Vas Conmigo", and a month later "Dejame Saber". The same year they came out with "A Solas" featuring Lyanno and "Como La Primera Vez" with Amarion. One of his first collaborations was "Luz Apaga" with Ozuna, Rauw Alejandro and Lyanno, reaching millions of views on YouTube. At the end of 2018, the remix of "A Solas" was released with Anuel AA, Brytiago and Alex Rose, positioning for several days on the YouTube Trending page. In March 2019, he released his single "Soltera", which achieved more than five million views in five days on YouTube. "Soltera" was also remixed in a version with Puerto Rican rappers Daddy Yankee and Bad Bunny. On August 5, 2020, he also collaborated with fellow American rapper Lil Mosey on the single "Top Gone". The single appeared on the deluxe edition of the latter's second studio album "Certified Hitmaker".

Musical style 
On his musical style, Lunay has commented that his songs do not encourage violence or denigrate women. In an interview he gave to the top 40, he said: "Not necessarily, even if I am in this world of urban music, [do] I have to be fostering violence, which is against God's purpose. I just do what I like and I know the relationship I have with Him." He won the award for artist "on the rise" at the 2019 Premios Juventud.

Discography

Studio albums

Singles

As lead artist

As a featured artist

Other charted and certified songs

Other appearances

References 

2000 births
Living people
People from Corozal, Puerto Rico
21st-century Puerto Rican male singers
Puerto Rican reggaeton musicians
Latin trap musicians
Singers from San Juan, Puerto Rico
Latin music songwriters